Neoterranova is a genus of parasitic nematodes that have life cycles involving sharks and reptiles.
The genus was created in 2020 to accommodate species which were previously included inTerranova Leiper & Atkinson, 1914  a taxon considered to be invalid.

Etymology
The name Neoterranova is composed of Terranova (the name of a nematode genus) and the prefix Neo- (= new). The gender is feminine.

Species
The type-species is N. scoliodontis (Baylis, 1931) Moravec & Justine, 2020. It is a parasite of the stomach and intestine of the Tiger shark Galeocerdo cuvier, first described in 1931.

Other species are listed in the taxobox.

See also 
Euterranova

References

External links 

Parasites
Parasitic nematodes of fish
Nematodes described in the 20th century
Ascaridida